Nambu is a cluster of Papuan languages spoken in the Morehead River region of Papua New Guinea.

Languages
Varieties are distinct but have some mutually intelligibility with their neighbors. Usher (2020) lists the following languages, with Nambo and Namna considered dialects of a single language.

East Morehead River
Neme–Ndre: Ndre (Dre, Ndré-di), Neme (Karigari, Dorro, Moi-e, Moive)
Upper Wassi Kussa: Nen (Nenium, Wekamara), Nambo–Namna (Nmbo, Nombuio, Tanjuamu, Keraki; Tendavi)
Central East Morehead River
Namo–Län: Län (Len, Dapo, Dungerwab, Parb, Tuj), Namo (Kaunje)
Nama–Namat: Nama (Noraia), Namat (Potoia)

References

External links 
 Timothy Usher, New Guinea World, Proto–East Morehead River (under construction 2020)

 
Languages of Western Province (Papua New Guinea)